Hakkas is a locality situated in Gällivare Municipality, Norrbotten County, Sweden with 365 inhabitants in 2010.

References

External links

Populated places in Gällivare Municipality
Lapland (Sweden)
Populated places in Arctic Sweden